Matrosovka is a rural locality (a village) in Yefremkinsky Selsoviet, Karmaskalinsky District, Bashkortostan, Russia. The population was 168 as of 2010. There are 2 streets.

Geography 
Matrosovka is located 20 km south of Karmaskaly (the district's administrative centre) by road. Bochkaryovka is the nearest rural locality.

References 

Rural localities in Karmaskalinsky District